Baklanovsky is a rural locality (a khutor) in Kulikovskoye Rural Settlement, Novonikolayevsky District, Volgograd Oblast, Russia. The population was 27 as of 2010. There are 6 streets.

Geography 
Baklanovsky is located in steppe, on the Khopyorsko-Buzulukskaya Plain, near the Biryuchy Pond, 29 km southeast of Novonikolayevsky (the district's administrative centre) by road. Kulikovsky is the nearest rural locality.

References 

Rural localities in Novonikolayevsky District